Kärleken är evig is the debut studio album from Swedish pop singer Lena Philipsson, released in 1986. The album peaked at #20 at the Swedish album charts.

Track listing
"Kärleken är evig" (Per Gessle, Torgny Söderberg)
"Åh Amadeus" (Fredrik Hansson, Per-Olof Thyrén)
"Det är här jag har mitt liv" (Söderberg, Ingela Forsman) 
"Stanna här hos mej" (Charlie Skarbek, L. Berg, Tim Smit)
"Vindarnas väg" (Peter Åhs)
"Jag sänder på min radio" (Gessle, Philipsson)
"Jag känner" ("Ti Sento") (Sergio Cossu, Salvatore Stellita, Jacob Dahlin, Carlo Marrale)
"Oskuldens ögon" (Forsman, J. Tcharnavskij, Leonid Derbenjov)
"Om kärleken är blind" (Forsman, Anders Glenmark)
"Löpa linan ut" (Forsman, Benny Borg, OV Lien, Peter Knutsen)
"Segla" (Phillipsson, Monica Forsberg)
"Helene" (Forsman, Mary Susan Applegate, Tony Hendrik, Karin van Haaren)

Charts

References

1986 debut albums
Lena Philipsson albums